Jason Hotchkin (born June 5, 1978 in Kalamazoo, Michigan) is a former American soccer player.

Career

College and amateur
Hotchkin had already played one year of professional soccer for the South Carolina Shamrocks in the USL D3 Pro League as an 18-year-old in 1997, prior to him attending college. He had a brief spell with St. Patrick's Athletic in the League of Ireland, playing several reserve league matches, and spent several months with training Cruz Azul in Mexico, but was not offered a contract.

He played college soccer at Milligan College, and then at Biola University in La Mirada, California, where he was named to the all-Golden State Athletic Conference team as a senior in 2003 when he registered 11 goals and a team-high 7 assists.

During his college years Hotchkin also played with the Southern California Seahorses of the USL Premier Development League, scoring 31 goals and 15 assists in 58 matches played over the course of three seasons, and being voted to the PDL Team for the Year in 2003.

Professional
In 2004  Hotchkin signed with Charlotte Eagles of the USL Pro Soccer League He appeared in 15 matches recording 5 goals and 4 assists. Charlotte finished league runner-up by losing on penalties to the Utah Blitz. In 2005, after a largely unsuccessful stint with German club TuS Koblenz  he moved to Sweden to play for IK Brage playing 15 matches. In 2006, he returned to the USL. He played 7 matches with the Wilmington Hammerheads scoring 2 times and recording 3 assists.

He spent two years playing in the Major Indoor Soccer League, with Philadelphia KiXX in 2006-07 and the New Jersey Ironmen in 2007-08, winning the MISL championship with Philadelphia.

Hotchkin joined the Cleveland City Stars late in the summer of 2008, helping them win the USL Second Division championship. In seven matches he scored twice and had 4 assists, and re-signed with the team for their inaugural USL First Division campaign in 2009. In 2010, he moved  to Harrisburg to play for the Islanders racking in 6 goals and 3 assists. He currently serves as the City Islanders Director of Player Development for their academy teams. He also spent some time playing with Major League Soccer side Columbus Crew's reserve team in 2008.

Hotchkin re-signed with Harrisburg on April 7, 2011.

References

External links
 Cleveland City Stars bio

1978 births
Living people
American soccer players
Charlotte Eagles players
Cleveland City Stars players
IK Brage players
Penn FC players
Major Indoor Soccer League (2001–2008) players
New Jersey Ironmen players
Orange County Blue Star players
Philadelphia KiXX players
South Carolina Shamrocks players
TuS Koblenz players
USL League Two players
USL First Division players
USL Second Division players
USL Championship players
Wilmington Hammerheads FC players
Soccer players from Michigan
Southern California Seahorses players
Association football midfielders
Association football forwards